The Naxalites is a 1980 Indian Hindi-language film directed by Khwaja Ahmad Abbas, starring Mithun Chakraborty, Smita Patil, Dina Pathak, Jalal Agha, Bijaya Jena, Imtiaz and Nana Palsikar

Plot

The Naxalites is the story of Naxalites and their life struggle against the system.

Songs
"Aaj Apne Lahu Se" - Antara Chowdhury

Cast
Mithun Chakraborty as Amor Kal
Smita Patil as Ajitha
Nana Palsikar as Charu Majumdar 
Dina Pathak
Jalal Agha
Bijaya Jena
Pinchoo Kapoor
Asit Sen
Imtiaz Khan as Haider Khan
Priyadarshini
Sunil Lahri

References

External links
 

1980 films
Films about Naxalism
Films directed by K. A. Abbas
1980s Hindi-language films
Films scored by Prem Dhawan
Films with screenplays by Khwaja Ahmad Abbas